The National Supervisory Authority for Welfare and Health (Valvira;) is a centralised body operating under the Ministry of Social Affairs and Health in Finland. Its statutory purpose is to supervise and provide guidance to healthcare and social services providers, alcohol administration authorities and environmental health bodies and to manage related licensing activities.

References

External links

Government of Finland